George Martinez, (born March 11, 1974), also known as "George Rithm Martinez" and "Hon. George Martinez", is an American educator, community entrepreneur, and artist. He is a former adjunct professor of political science at Pace University and a cultural ambassador for the U.S. Department of State for the Western Hemisphere. He was elected in 2002 as the district leader in the 51st Assembly District in Sunset Park, Brooklyn and a former Assistant Director of Intergovernmental Affairs for the Office of the New York State Attorney General. He is the first hip-hop artist elected to political office in New York.

Martinez is the founder and director of the nonprofit organization, The Global Block Foundation. He is the co-author and editor of The Organic Globalizer: Hip Hop, Political Development and Movement Culture.

Education
George graduated from Brooklyn Technical High School in 1992. He is the first person in his immediate family to go to college receiving his A.A. in Liberal Arts from Borough of Manhattan Community in 1996 and his B.A. in Political Science (Magna Cum Laude) in 1998. He was the recipient of the competitive Robert L. Lindsay Memorial /MAGNET Doctoral Fellowship at the CUNY Graduate Center in the Political Science program.

George began his teaching career as an adjunct lecturer at Hunter College of the City University of New York.
George is a former adjunct professor of political science at Pace University in New York, where he taught American Politics and a self-developed course, "The Politics of Hip Hop".

Community engagement
Martinez is a long time social entrepreneur and grassroots organizer. In 1997, Martinez co-founded Blackout Arts Collective, a nonprofit organization dedicated to empowering communities of color through arts activism and education. In 2002, Blackout received the Union Square Award for Grass Roots Activism.

Martinez served as the Chairman of the board of directors for the Hip Hop Association (H2A). The Hip Hop Association received the Union Square Award for the Arts in 2007.

In 2008, he was branded as an "Urban Hero" for his work with homeless children at Covenant House in Tegucigalpa, Honduras.

In 2012, in the wake of super storm Sandy, George was identified as one of 3 "Hip Hop Luminaries" that donated their time and energy to the post-storm relief and Occupy Sandy fundraising efforts, along with Immortal Technique and Jasiri X.

In 2013, Martinez was selected as a 40 Under 40 Rising Latino Stars of New York State by the Hispanic Coalition of NY, Inc.

Hip Hop history
In 1995, Martinez discovered a young rapper named, What? What? who later became known as Jean Grae and recruited her for his experimental Hip Hop group, Ground Zero. In March 1996, Martinez (Rithm) appeared as the Unsigned Hype in The Source along with rapper, Jean Grae.

In 2013, Martinez's song, "Occupation Freedom" (2011), was identified by the "Stream Community" on the Al Jazeera America network as one of the top 15 political/ social hip-hop songs ever. The list also included, "U.N.I.T.Y" by Queen Latifah, "The Message" by Grandmaster Flash and The Furious Five, and "Changes" by 2pac.

References

External links
Biography at Ballotpedia

Living people
American political scientists
Politicians from New York City
Social entrepreneurs
American people of Puerto Rican descent
Hip hop activists
Rappers from Brooklyn
1974 births
21st-century American rappers
Brooklyn College alumni